Fascia is a layer of connective tissue in the human body.

Fascia may also refer to:
 Fascia, Liguria, a comune in the Province of Genoa, Italy
 Cima della Fascia, a mountain of the Ligurian Alps, in Italy
 Fascia (district)
 Fascia (architecture), a long, horizontal surface across the top of a structure
 Fascia (car), a dashboard of a car; or the front and rear ends of a car
 Fascia (phone), a removable mobile phone housing
 Fascia (sash), a sash worn higher than the waist by Roman Catholic clerics
 Fascia, a transverse band of a different color on insect anatomy
 FASCIA (database), a U.S. National Security Agency database

See also
 Fasces
 Fascio
 Facia Group, a company founded by Stephen Hinchliffe